Miskolci Vizilabda Club is a water polo club from Miskolc, Hungary. The team competes in the Országos Bajnokság I.

Current squad
Season 2022–23

Staff

Transfers (2022-23)
<small>

 In:
Nikola Brkić (from ANO Glyfada)
 Stefan Porobić (from VK Valis Valjevo)
 Nikolov Nikola (from VK Vojvodina)

 Out:
 Lukáš Seman (to VK Crvena zvezda)

Keret 

2018–19-es szezon

Átigazolások (2018-19)

 Érkezők:
 Lőrincz Bálint (ZF-Eger-től)
 Bedő Krisztián (ZF-Eger-től)
 Ognjen Stojanović (VK Crvena zvezda-tól)
 Bojan Banićević (PVK Jadran Herceg Novi-tól)
 Szőke Szabolcs (Debreceni VSE-től)
 Mizsei Márton (BVSC-Zugló II-től)

 Távozók:
 Kuzmenko Aleksey (Metalcom Szentes-hez)
 Lukács Dénes Dorián (ZF-Eger-hez)
 Sánta Dániel (ZF-Eger-hez)
 Jakab Dániel (PVSK-Mecsek Füszért-hez)
 Berta József (Kaposvári VK-hoz)
 Halek Márton (VasasPlaket-hez)
 Kósik Soma (Debreceni VSE-hez)

Season 2017–18

Staff

Transfers (2017-18)
Source: vizipolo.hu

 In:
 József Berta (from Kaposvár)
 Farkas Dőry (from Ferencváros)
 Aleksey Kuzmeno (from Kinef Kirishi)
 Ádám Nagy (from Orvosegyetem)
 Dániel Sánta (from Szeged)

 Out:
 Ábel Lukács (to Kaposvár)
 Levente Miklós (to Vasas)
  Roland Szabó (to )

Recent seasons

Rankings in OB I

In European competition
Participations in Euro Cup: 2x

Coaches
 József Sike (2015 – present)

References

External links
 

Water polo clubs in Hungary